is a Japanese manga series written and illustrated by Shūzō Oshimi. It has been serialized in Shogakukan's seinen manga magazine Big Comic Superior since February 2017, with its chapters collected into 15 tankōbon volumes as of January 2023. The story follows a middle school student, Seiichi Osabe, and his relationship with his overprotective mother, who after a certain event, begins to show a darker and horrifying side towards her son.

The series is licensed for an English release in North America by Vertical, who started releasing the volumes in print in February 2020, and it is also digitally published by Kodansha USA since August of the same year.

By September 2022, Blood on the Tracks had over 2 million copies in circulation.

Plot
Seiichi Osabe is a shy middle school student living a relatively ordinary life. His mother, Seiko, is considered overprotective of him by others, although Seiichi is comfortable with the love and care from his mother and does not feel anything strange about her behavior. One day, Seiichi goes on a family hiking trip with his parents and paternal family. At one point, Seiichi's cousin, Shigeru, jokingly pushes Seiichi near a cliff edge, leading Seiko to quickly grab hold of Seiichi, protecting him from falling. The rest of the family starts laughing at Seiko over her "overprotective" act. A while later, Seiichi and Shigeru go to a higher cliff edge, and when Shigeru is on the cliff edge, Seiko, who was following them, approaches her nephew and pushes him off the cliff, giving a brief smile to her son. After the incident, where Shigeru is left in a comatose state and Seiichi was the only witness of what happened, he begins to discover how dangerous his mother's affection can become, and what follows is a series of events in which Seiichi's everyday life becomes a horror living under the disturbing protection of his own mother.

Characters

Seiichi is a shy middle school student with few friends and susceptible to manipulation and abuse. Seiichi is ridiculed due to the overprotective care that his mother, Seiko, has over him. However, after Seiko pushes Seiichi's cousin, Shigeru, off a cliff, his life is turned upside down, and Seiko begins to manipulate him more and more heavily. As a result of the psychological trauma his mother inflicts upon him, he develops linguistic problems.

Seiko is Seiichi's mother. Seiko has psychiatric disorders and has an obsessive relationship with her son that pushes the boundaries of overprotectivity. She does not care about anything but her son and she is afraid that someone will take him away. Although, it is later revealed that she tried to kill him when he was smaller, throwing him off a hill slope. Seiko manages to disguise her true personality and manipulate Seiichi's memories of the past. 

Yuko is Seiichi's classmate. She lives alone with her alcoholic and abusive father, with whom she has a bad relationship after her mother abandoned them when she was younger. Seiichi and Yuko fall in love, and she is the first to make him start doubting his mother's actions and their manipulative relationship.

Ichirō is Seiichi's father and Seiko's husband. He is a salaryman who works hard to keep the family together after the cliff incident. Ichirō has a caring and kind demeanor and a calm disposition. However, although he loves his family, he is not conscious about their problematic situation until Seiko tells Shigeru's parents that she pushed him off the cliff, and even then, Ichirō does not demonstrate a willingness to divorce when his wife suggests it.

Shigeru is Seiichi's cousin. He enjoys messing with Seiichi and is rude to say what he thinks, teasing Seiichi over his relationship with his mother. During a family hiking trip, Seiiko pushes him off a cliff. Although Shigeru survives, he is left in a comatose state. Later, thanks to rehabilitation and the care of his mother, Seiichi's aunt, Shigeru partially regains consciousness and is terrified when he recognizes his aunt Seiko.

Publication
Blood on the Tracks, written and illustrated by Shūzō Oshimi, began in Shogakukan's seinen manga magazine Big Comic Superior on February 24, 2017. According to Oshimi, the Bob Dylan album of the same name inspired the title for the series, but was not a major influence on the story. Shogakukan has compiled its chapters into individual tankōbon volumes. The first volume was published on September 8, 2017. As of January 30, 2023, fifteen volumes have been published.

In July 2019, Vertical announced that they have licensed the manga for an English language release in North America. The first volume was published on February 25, 2020. In July 2020, Kodansha USA announced the digital release of the manga, which started in August of the same year.

Volume list

Reception
By May 2020, the manga had over 1 million copies in circulation; over 1.5 million copies in circulation by June 2021; and over 2 million copies in circulation by September 2022. The series ranked 9th on Kono Manga ga Sugoi!s top 20 manga for male readers 2018. It was nominated for a Harvey Award in the Best Manga category in 2022. The series was nominated for the 68th Shogakukan Manga Award in the general category in 2022.

Ian Wolf from Anime UK News praised the series' storytelling and Oshimi's artwork, highlighting the "detailed and sometimes disturbing close-ups" and "great views of the wilderness". Regarding the series' title, Wolf commented that something from Pink Floyd's The Wall, in which "the narrator has issues with his domineering mother", would have been more fitting. Wolf concluded: "Blood on the Tracks has been thrilling reading so far, and it will be interesting to see where Oshimi takes the story".

References

Further reading

External links
  
 

Child abuse in fiction
Psychological horror anime and manga
Psychological thriller anime and manga
Seinen manga
Shogakukan manga
Vertical (publisher) titles